= Boserolimab =

Monoclonal antibody

Monoclonal antibody
- Type: ?

Clinical data
- Other names: MK-5890

Legal status
- Legal status: Investigational

Identifiers
- CAS Number: 2444297-08-7
- PubChem SID: 497620669
- DrugBank: DB17452
- UNII: 576SCZ7V2P
- KEGG: D12256

Boserolimab (MK-5890) is a monoclonal antibody in development for lung cancer. It is developed by Merck.
